The Hedgerows Regulations 1997 of England and Wales is a UK Statutory Instrument (1997 No. 1160) which came into effect on 1 June 1997 and is government legislation which falls under the Environment Act 1995. It was created to protect hedgerows, in particular those in the countryside aged 30 years or older. Since the legislation came into effect it is a criminal offence to remove a hedgerow in contravention to the regulations.

The legislation includes sub-categories detailing specific descriptions of offences, the procedure of notification to the local planning authority, circumstances that exempt the need to notify, replacement and retention notices, appeals against those notices, local planning authority records of hedgerows, injunctions, and how hedgerows may be defined to be 'important'.

References

Environmental law in the United Kingdom
Town and country planning in the United Kingdom
Statutory Instruments of the United Kingdom